Roberto Daniel Órdenes Contreras (born 5 January 1981) is a Chilean former footballer who played as midfielder.

Club career
Órdenes was champion with the Unión Española in the Torneo Apertura 2005, where he starred in the great campaign in the red team. 

After abruptly leaving the club's preseason Ñublense of Chillan for allegedly calling a club of Israel, after days reappeared wearing the colors in Unión Española.

O'Higgins
Órdenes won the Apertura 2013-14 with O'Higgins. In the tournament, he played in 15 of 18 matches.

In 2014, he won the Supercopa de Chile against Deportes Iquique, match that O'Higgins won at the penalty shoot-out. 

He participated with the club in the 2014 Copa Libertadores where they faced Deportivo Cali, Cerro Porteño and Lanús, being third and being eliminated in the group stage.

International career
Órdenes was part of Chile U20 team argued that the 2001 FIFA World Youth Championship in 2001.

Controversies
Previous to 2001 FIFA World Youth Championship, Órdenes and seven other players were arrested in a brothel what must to be closed. The incident was known as "El episodio de las luces rojas" (Chapter of the red lights) due to the excuse employed by Jaime Valdés.

After the tournament, the eight players (Valdés, Millar, Salgado, Pardo, Soto, Droguett, Campos and Órdenes) were suspended for three international matches.

Honours

Club
Unión Española
Primera División de Chile: 2005 Apertura

O'Higgins
Primera División de Chile: 2013 Apertura
Supercopa de Chile: 2014

Individual
O'Higgins
Medalla Santa Cruz de Triana: 2014

References

External links

1981 births
Living people
Footballers from Santiago
Association football midfielders
Chilean footballers
Chile under-20 international footballers
Chilean expatriate footballers
Unión Española footballers
FC Locarno players
Universidad de Concepción footballers
Ñublense footballers
Unión La Calera footballers
Santiago Wanderers footballers
O'Higgins F.C. footballers
Magallanes footballers
Deportes Magallanes footballers
Deportes Melipilla footballers
Chilean Primera División players
Swiss Challenge League players
Primera B de Chile players
Segunda División Profesional de Chile players
Expatriate footballers in Switzerland
Chilean expatriate sportspeople in Switzerland